Led Zeppelin was  an English rock band whose career spanned twelve years from 1968 to 1980. They are considered one of the most successful, innovative, and influential rock groups in history. During the band's tenure and in the years since they disbanded, many artists have recorded and released cover versions of their songs. These include complete tribute albums, live versions, as well as versions on studio albums. Led Zeppelin has also garnered tribute acts, such as Dread Zeppelin, who performs their songs in a reggae style as sung by an obese Elvis impersonator, and the all-female Zepparella.

This list catalogues songs credited to Led Zeppelin or the individual group members (Jimmy Page, Robert Plant, John Paul Jones, and John Bonham) that have been subsequently recorded or sampled by other artists. Only officially released recordings by notable artists are includedthe list does not include bootleg or unrecorded live performances, or any unreleased demo recordings.  Additionally, it does not include songs recorded or performed by Led Zeppelin that are officially credited (fully or partially) to other songwriters.

List

References

Led Zeppelin
 Cover
Led Zeppelin Covers